The Asia/Oceania Zone was one of three zones of regional competition in the 1998 Fed Cup.

Group I
Venue: Thana City Golf Club, Samutpakarn, Thailand (outdoor hard)
Date: 16–20 February

The nine teams were first randomly divided into three pools of three teams to compete in round-robin competitions. The nine teams were then divided into three new pools based on their placing in their first pools, which would be used to determine each team's overall placing in the zonal group. The team that finished first overall would be promoted to the World Group II Play-offs, while the team that finished ninth would be relegated to Group II for 1999.

Initial Pools

Placement Pools

  advanced to World Group II Play-offs.
  relegated to Group II in 1999.

Group II
Venue: Thana City Golf Club, Samutpakarn, Thailand (outdoor hard)
Date: 16–21 February

The nine teams were first randomly divided into three pools of three teams to compete in round-robin competitions. The nine teams were then divided into three new pools based on their placing in their first pools, which would be used to determine each team's overall placing in the zonal group. The teams that finished first and second overall would be promoted to Group I for 1999.

Initial Pools

Placement Pools

  and  Pacific Oceania advanced to Group I in 1999.

See also
Fed Cup structure

References

 Fed Cup Profile, Chinese Taipei
 Fed Cup Profile, Indonesia
 Fed Cup Profile, South Korea
 Fed Cup Profile, Hong Kong
 Fed Cup Profile, Philippines
 Fed Cup Profile, Thailand
 Fed Cup Profile, India
 Fed Cup Profile, Pakistan
 Fed Cup Profile, Pacific Oceania
 Fed Cup Profile, Singapore
 Fed Cup Profile, Kazakhstan
 Fed Cup Profile, Syria

External links
 Fed Cup website

 
Asia Oceania
Sport in Samutpakarn
Tennis tournaments in Thailand